The Çayeli mine is a large mine in the east of Turkey in Rize Province 470 km east of the capital, Ankara. Çayeli represents one of the largest copper reserve in Turkey having estimated reserves of 20 million tonnes of ore grading 2.5% copper. The 20 million tonnes of ore contains 500,000 tonnes of copper metal.

References

External links 
 Official site

Copper mines in Turkey
Buildings and structures in Rize Province
Geography of Rize Province